Kate Walsh (1 March 1947 – 24 April 2007) was an Irish Progressive Democrats politician and community activist from Celbridge, County Kildare. In 2002 she was nominated by the Taoiseach as a member of Seanad Éireann.

Walsh was elected to Kildare County Council at the 1999 local elections, when she stood as an independent and won over one-and-a-half quotas on the first count. She later joined the Progressive Democrats (PDs), and stood unsuccessfully as a PD candidate for Dáil Éireann in the Kildare North at the 2002 general election. She was unsuccessful again at the by-election in 2005. Walsh was Mayor of Celbridge from 1982 to 2007.

She died on 24 April 2007 from complications related to diabetes, after a long illness.

References

1947 births
2007 deaths
Local councillors in County Kildare
Members of the 22nd Seanad
21st-century women members of Seanad Éireann
People from Celbridge
Politicians from County Laois
Politicians from County Kildare
Progressive Democrats senators
20th-century Irish women politicians
Nominated members of Seanad Éireann